Timur Andreyevich Akmurzin (born 7 December 1997) is a Russian football player who plays for Tobol.

Club career
He made his professional debut in the Russian Professional Football League for FC Rubin-2 Kazan on 18 July 2014 in a game against FC Syzran-2003 Syzran.

He made his Russian Football National League debut for FC Spartak-2 Moscow on 7 July 2019 in a game against FC Baltika Kaliningrad.

On 23 June 2022, Tobol announced the signing of Akmurzin.

References

External links
 
 

1997 births
Footballers from Moscow
Living people
Russian footballers
Association football goalkeepers
Russia youth international footballers
FC Rubin Kazan players
FC Ufa players
FC Spartak-2 Moscow players
FC Spartak Moscow players